Alan Trinler Huckleberry (born February 18, 1941) is an American mathematician who works in complex analysis, Lie groups actions and algebraic geometry. He is currently (since 2009) Professor Emeritus of Mathematics at Ruhr University Bochum and Wisdom Professor of Mathematics at Jacobs University Bremen in Germany.

Professional career
He received his B.S. from Yale University in 1963 and his Ph.D. from Stanford University in 1969 working under Halsey Royden. His Ph.D. thesis was titled: Holomorphic Mappings and algebras of holomorphic functions of several complex variables. He has previously taught at University of Notre Dame before joining Ruhr University Bochum in 1980.

Huckleberry has honorary doctor’s degrees from University of Lile (France) in 1997, and from University of Nancy (France) in 2002.

In addition to pure mathematics, he also works in applications of symplectic geometry in quantum entanglement and in other problems of mathematical physics.

Writings 
 with Bruce Gilligan, Fibrations and Globalizations of Compact Homogeneous CR-Manifolds, Izvestiya: Mathematics, 73:3,(2009) 501 - 553.
with Gregor Fels, Joseph A. Wolf Cycle spaces of flag domains: a complex geometric point of view, Birkhäuser 2006
 
as editor with Tilman Wurzbacher Infinite dimensional Kähler Manifolds, Birkhäuser 2001 (DMV Seminar Oberwolfach 1995)
as editor with Fabrizio Catanese, Hélène Esnault, Klaus Hulek, Thomas Peternell Global aspects of complex geometry, Springer Verlag 2006 
The classification of homogeneous surfaces, Expositiones mathematicae 4 (1986), 289-334
Actions of groups of holomorphic transformations, in: Several Complex Variables VI, Encyclopedia of Math. Sciences, Band.69, Springer-Verlag  1991, 143-196
with Peternell, Artikel Several complex variables: basic geometric theory and Complex manifolds in Francoise, Naber, Tsun (Hrsg.), Encyclopedia of Mathematical Physics, Elsevier 2006

External links 
Homepage
 

Living people
20th-century American mathematicians
American emigrants to Germany
Academic staff of Ruhr University Bochum
1941 births
Stanford University faculty
University of Notre Dame faculty
Academic staff of Jacobs University Bremen
21st-century American mathematicians